Russell Eldon Kerns (November 10, 1920 – August 21, 2000) was an American Major League Baseball player who played in one game for the Detroit Tigers on August 18, . He went hitless in one at bat.

External links
Baseball Reference major league statistics
Baseball Reference minor league statistics
Venezuelan Professional Baseball League statistics

1920 births
2000 deaths
Baseball players from Ohio
Charleston Senators players
Columbus Red Birds players
Detroit Tigers players
Hornell Maple Leafs players
Jamestown Falcons players
Lima Pandas players
Moline Plow Boys players
Nashville Vols players
Omaha Cardinals players
Patriotas de Venezuela players
Superior Blues players
Syracuse Chiefs players
Tiffin Mud Hens players
Toledo Mud Hens players
Toledo Sox players
Williamsport Grays players